Cavalier of the West is a 1931 American Western film written and directed by John P. McCarthy. Distributed by State Rights, Weiss Bros. and Artclass Pictures Corp., the film was released in the US on November 15, 1931, and marked the acting debut of five-year old Elena Verdugo, in an uncredited appearance.

Premise 
Captain John Allister of the United States Cavalry discovers Deputy Sheriff "Red" Greeley and four companions in the act of attacking a group of Indians. Through a ruse, John proves that their accusation that the Indians were rustling horses was merely an excuse to steal the gold that the Indians were transporting to El Rio.

Cast 
Harry Carey as Captain John Allister
Carmen Laroux as Dolores Fernandez
Kane Richmond as Lieutenant Wilbur Allister
Christine Montt as Chiquita
Geo. F. Hayes as Sheriff Bill Ryan
Ted Adams as Lee Burgess
Maston Williams as Deputy "Red" Greeley
Paul Panzer as Don Fernandez
P. Narcha as White Feather
Ben Corbett as Sergeant Regan

References

External links 
 
 

Films directed by John P. McCarthy
American Western (genre) films
1930 Western (genre) films
1930 films
American black-and-white films
1930s American films